The  is a botanical garden located at 5-17-14 Akatsuka, Itabashi, Tokyo, Japan. It is open daily.

The garden is located in Akatsuka's hills and contains over 600 varieties of trees and plants. The Manyo Yakuyo Garden is a Manyo Botanical Garden containing medicinal herbs mentioned in the Man'yōshū anthology.

References

External links
 Itabashi City entry (Japanese)
 Museum Directory entry (Japanese)
 Tokyo Tourism Info article
 Japan Times article
 Japan Navigator article

See also 
 List of botanical gardens in Japan

 
Botanical gardens in Japan
Gardens in Tokyo